The 2013 Svijany Open was a professional tennis tournament played on clay courts. It was the 1st edition of the tournament which was part of the 2013 ATP Challenger Tour. It took place in Liberec, Czech Republic between 29 July and 4 August 2013.

ATP entrants

Seeds

 1 Rankings are as of July 22, 2013.

Other entrants
The following players received wildcards into the singles main draw:
  Michal Konečný
  Michal Schmid
  Adam Pavlásek
  Jan Kunčík

The following players received entry as an Alternate
  Filip Krajinović
  Thomas Schoorel

The following players received entry from the qualifying draw:
  Edward Corrie
  Ivo Klec
  Marek Michalička
  Grzegorz Panfil

Champions

Singles

 Jiří Veselý def.  Federico Delbonis 6–7(2–7), 7–6(9–7), 6–4

Doubles

 Rameez Junaid /  Tim Pütz def.  Colin Ebelthite /  Lee Hsin-han 6–0, 6–2

External links
ITF Search
ATP official site

 
Svijany Open
Svijany Open
Sport in Liberec
Svijany Open
Svijany Open